WTN may refer to:

W Network, a Canadian cable channel from 1995 to about 2001
Whitton railway station, London, National Rail station code
World Tibet News, created in 1992
Worldwide TV News, which in 1998 merged into Associated Press Television News
WWTN, an FM radio station in Nashville, Tennessee, USA, known as "99.7 WTN"
Williston, North Dakota (Amtrak station code: WTN)
RAF Waddington, England (IATA airport code: WTN)